Robert Law Weed (1897–1961) was an architect from Miami, Florida. He designed many Modernist buildings in Miami and abroad.

Some of his projects
 Florida Tropical House, built for the Homes of Tomorrow Exhibition during the 1933 World's Fair which took place in Chicago.
 Grand Concourse Apartments, 1926,  at 421 Grand Concourse in Miami Shores, Florida, which is listed on the U.S. National Register of Historic Places.
 Miami Shores Elementary School, 1929.
 Shrine Building (Miami, Florida), 1930, an Art Deco building that was nominated for NRHP listing.
 Italian Village, 1925–1927, Coral Gables.

References
Notes

Bibliography

 Patricios, Nicholas N. Building Marvelous Miami. Gainesville, FL: University Press of Florida, 1994. .

1897 births
1961 deaths
Modernist architects
Architects from Miami